Jorge Quiñones  (born ) is a Mexican male volleyball player. He was part of the Mexico men's national volleyball team at the 2014 FIVB Volleyball Men's World Championship in Poland. He played for Guanajuato.

Clubs
 Guanajuato (2014)

References

1981 births
Living people
Mexican men's volleyball players
Place of birth missing (living people)
Olympic volleyball players of Mexico
Volleyball players at the 2016 Summer Olympics